A total lunar eclipse took place on Thursday, June 25, 1964. The moon passed through the center of the Earth's shadow.

Visibility
It was completely visible from South America and Africa, seen as rising over North America, and setting over Europe and Western Asia.

Related lunar eclipses

Lunar year series

Saros series

It last occurred on June 14, 1946 and will next occur on July 6, 1982.

This is the 35th member of Lunar Saros 129. The previous event was the June 1946 lunar eclipse. The next event is the July 1982 lunar eclipse. Lunar Saros 129 contains 11 total lunar eclipses between 1910 and 2090. Solar Saros 136 interleaves with this lunar saros with an event occurring every 9 years 5 days alternating between each saros series.

Half-Saros cycle
A lunar eclipse will be preceded and followed by solar eclipses by 9 years and 5.5 days (a half saros). This lunar eclipse is related to two total solar eclipses of Solar Saros 136.

See also
List of lunar eclipses
List of 20th-century lunar eclipses

Notes

External links

1964-06
1964-06
1964 in science
June 1964 events